Frigyes Hegedűs (14 May 1920 – 1 June 2008) was a Hungarian modern pentathlete. He competed at the 1948 Summer Olympics.

References

External links
 

1920 births
2008 deaths
Hungarian male modern pentathletes
Olympic modern pentathletes of Hungary
Modern pentathletes at the 1948 Summer Olympics
People from Nagykőrös
Sportspeople from Pest County
20th-century Hungarian people
21st-century Hungarian people